The Uchi Subprovince is a Neoarchean volcanic sequence in Manitoba, Canada. It is at the southern margin of the North Caribou terrane and comprises a number of greenstone belts, which contains volcanic rocks that record some 280 million years of volcanism.

See also
Volcanism of Canada
Volcanism of Western Canada

References

Volcanism of Manitoba
Greenstone belts
Neoarchean volcanism